Gymnocondylus is a genus of Brazilian flowering plants in the family Asteraceae.

There is only one known species, Gymnocondylus galeopsifolius, native to Brazil (Goiás and Distrito Federal).

References

Monotypic Asteraceae genera
Eupatorieae
Endemic flora of Brazil